Anatol Karp (born 2 October 1992) is a Belarusian former professional football player.

External links
 
 
 Profile at pressball.by

1992 births
Living people
Belarusian footballers
Association football midfielders
FC Partizan Minsk players
FC Shakhtyor Soligorsk players
FC Energetik-BGU Minsk players